Catocala nivea is a moth in the family Erebidae first described by Arthur Gardiner Butler in 1877. It is found in Japan and Taiwan.

Subspecies
Catocala nivea nivea
Catocala nivea asahinaorum Owada, 1986 (Taiwan)
Catocala nivea krosawai Owada, 1986

References

nivea
Moths described in 1877
Moths of Asia